Lalibela is a town in the Amhara Region of Ethiopia. Located in the Lasta district and North Wollo Zone, it is a tourist site for its  famous rock-cut monolithic churches. The whole of Lalibela is a large and important site for the antiquity, medieval, and post-medieval civilization of Ethiopia. To Christians, Lalibela is one of Ethiopia's holiest cities, and a center of pilgrimage.

Ethiopia was one of the earliest nations to adopt Christianity in the first half of the 4th century, and its historical roots date to the time of the Apostles. The churches themselves date from the 7th to 13th centuries, and are traditionally dated to the reign of the Zagwe (Agaw) king Gebre Mesqel Lalibela (r. ca. 1181–1221).

The layout and names of the major buildings in Lalibela are widely accepted, especially by local clergy, to be a symbolic representation of Jerusalem. This has led some experts to date the current church construction to the years following the capture of Jerusalem in 1187 by the Muslim leader Saladin.

It is the main town in Lasta, which was formerly part of the Bugna district. The rock-hewn churches were declared a World Heritage Site in 1978.

History

During the reign of Gebre Mesqel Lalibela, a member of the Zagwe dynasty who ruled Ethiopia in the late 12th century and early 13th century, the current town of Lalibela was known as Roha. The saint-king was named because a swarm of bees is said to have surrounded him at his birth, which his mother took as a sign of his future reign as emperor of Ethiopia. The names of several places in the modern town and the general layout of the rock-cut churches themselves are said to mimic names and patterns observed by Lalibela during the time he spent as a youth in Jerusalem and the Holy Land.

Lalibela, revered as a saint, is said to have visited Jerusalem and attempted to recreate a new Jerusalem as his capital in response to the taking of old Jerusalem by Muslims in 1187. Each church was carved from a single piece of rock to symbolize spirituality and humility. The Christian faith inspired many features receiving Biblical names; even Lalibela's river is known as the River Jordan. Lalibela remained the capital of Ethiopia from the late 12th into the 13th century.

The first European known to see these churches was the Portuguese explorer Pêro da Covilhã (1460–1526). A Portuguese priest, Francisco Álvares (1465–1540), accompanied the Portuguese Ambassador on a visit to Dawit II in the 1520s. Alvares described the unique church structures as follows: "I weary of writing more about these buildings, because it seems to me that I shall not be believed if I write more... I swear by God, in Whose power I am, that all I have written is the truth".

Although Ramuso included the plans of several of these churches in his 1550 printing of Álvares' book, it is unknown who provided him with the drawings. The next reported European visitor to Lalibela was Miguel de Castanhoso, who was a soldier under Cristóvão da Gama and left Ethiopia in 1544. After de Castanhoso, more than 300 years passed until another European, Gerhard Rohlfs, visited Lalibela sometime between 1865 and 1870.

According to the Futuh al-Habaša of Sihab ad-Din Ahmad, Ahmad ibn Ibrahim al-Ghazi burned one of the churches of Lalibela during his invasion of Ethiopia. However, Richard Pankhurst has expressed skepticism about this, pointing out that although Sihab ad-Din Ahmad provided a detailed description of a rock-hewn church ("It was carved out of the mountain. Its pillars were likewise cut from the mountain."), only one church is mentioned; Pankhurst adds that "what is special about Lalibela, (as every tourist knows), is that it is the site of eleven or so rock churches, not just one, and they are all within more or less a stone's throw of each other!"

Pankhurst also notes that the Royal Chronicles, which mention Ahmad al-Ghazi's laying waste to the district between July and September 1531, are silent about him ravaging the fabled churches of this city. He concludes by stating that had Ahmad al-Ghazi burned a church at Lalibela, it was most likely Biete Medhane Alem; and if the Muslim army was either mistaken or misled by the locals, then the church he set fire to was Gannata Maryam, "10 miles [16 km] east of Lalibela which likewise has a colonnade of pillars cut from the mountain."

Tigray War

In early August 2021, TPLF aligned fighters captured the town during the Tigray War. On 1 December 2021, the Ethiopian government claimed to have recaptured the town. Borkena reported, that the victory over the TPLF in the town of Gashena played a vital role in the recapture of Lalibela by the ENDF, Amhara Special Forces, and milita. The town was recaptured again by the TPLF on 12 December. On 19 December, Ethiopian state media announced the town was recaptured for a second time, though it was unclear when.

Churches

This rural town is known around the world for its churches carved from within the earth from "living rock," which play an important part in the history of rock-cut architecture. Though the dating of the churches is not well established, most are thought to have been built during the reign of Lalibela, namely during the 12th and 13th centuries. Unesco identifies 11 churches, assembled in four groups:

The Northern Group: 
Biete Medhane Alem (House of the Saviour of the World), home to the Lalibela Cross. (Here is the 3D model of Biete Medhane Alem)
Biete Maryam (House of Miriam/House of Mary), possibly the oldest of the churches, and a replica of the Tombs of Adam and Christ. (Here is the 3D model of Biete Mariam)
 (House of Golgotha Mikael), known for its arts and said to contain the tomb of King Lalibela)
Biete Meskel (House of the Cross)
Biete Denagel (House of Virgins)

The Western Group: 
Church of Saint George, thought to be the most finely executed and best preserved church (Here the 3D Model of Saint George)

The Eastern Group: 
Biete Amanuel (House of Immanuel), possibly the former royal chapel. (Here the 3D model of Biete Amanuel)
Biete Qeddus Mercoreus (House of Saint Mercurius/House of Mark the Evangelist), which may be a former prison
Biete Abba Libanos (House of Abbot Libanos) (Here the 3D model of Biete Abba Libanos)
Biete Gabriel-Rufael (House of the angels Gabriel, and Raphael) possibly a former royal palace, linked to a holy bakery.
Biete Lehem ("Bethlehem",  "House of Bread").

Farther afield, lie the monastery of Ashetan Maryam and Yemrehana Krestos Church (possibly eleventh century, built in the Aksumite fashion, but within a cave).

There is some controversy as to when some of the churches were constructed. David Buxton established the generally accepted chronology, noting that "two of them follow, with great fidelity of detail, the tradition represented by Debra Damo as modified at Yemrahana Kristos." Since the time spent to carve these structures from the living rock must have taken longer than the few decades of King Lalibela's reign, Buxton assumes that the work extended into the 14th century. However, David Phillipson, professor of African archeology at University of Cambridge, has proposed that the churches of Merkorios, Gabriel-Rufael, and Danagel were initially carved out of the rock half a millennium earlier, as fortifications or other palace structures in the waning days of the Kingdom of Aksum, and that Lalibela's name simply came to be associated with them after his death. On the other hand, local historian Getachew Mekonnen credits Gebre Mesqel Lalibela, Lalibela's queen, with having one of the rock-hewn churches, Biete Abba Libanos, built as a memorial for her husband after his death.

Contrary to claims made by pseudoarchaeologist writers like Graham Hancock, Buxton states the great rock-hewn churches of Lalibela were not built with the help of the Knights Templar; asserting abundant evidence exists to show that they were produced solely by medieval Ethiopian civilization. For example, while Buxton notes the existence of a tradition that "Abyssinians invoked the aid of foreigners" to construct these monolithic churches, and admits that "there are clearly signs of Coptic influence in some decorative details" (hardly surprising given the theological, ecclesiastical, and cultural links between the Orthodox Tewahedo and Coptic Orthodox Churches), he is adamant about the native origins of these creations: "But the significant fact remains that the rock-churches continue to follow the style of the local built-up prototypes, which themselves retain clear evidence of their basically Axumite origin."

The churches are also a significant engineering feat, given that they are all associated with water (which fills the wells next to many of the churches), exploiting an artesian geological system that brings the water up to the top of the mountain ridge on which the city rests.

Vernacular architecture

In a 1970 report of the historic dwellings of Lalibela, Sandro Angelini evaluated the vernacular earthen architecture on the Lalibela World Heritage Site, including the characteristics of the traditional earth houses and analysis of their state of conservation.

His report described two types of vernacular housing found in the area. One type are a group he calls the "tukuls", round huts built of stone and usually having two stories. The second are the single-story "chika" buildings which are round and built of earth and wattle, which he feels reflects more "scarcity". Angel's report also included an inventory of Lalibela's traditional buildings, placing them in categories rating their state of conservation.

Other features
Lalibela is also home to an airport (ICAO code HALL, IATA LLI), a large market, two schools, and a hospital.

Demographics 
According to the 2007 Census Data, the population was 17,367, of whom 8,112 were males and 9,255 were females. Based on previous figures from the Central Statistical Agency in 2005, the town had an estimated total population of 14,668 of whom 7,049 were males and 7,619 were females. The 1994 national census recorded its population to be 8,484 of whom 3,709 were males and 4,775 were females.

Gallery

See also
 Rock-cut architecture
 Monolithic church
 Rock-Hewn Churches, Lalibela
 List of World Heritage Sites in Ethiopia
 List of colossal sculptures in situ

References

Further reading 
 David W. Phillipson, Ancient Churches of Ethiopia (New Haven: Yale University Press, 2009). Chapter 5, "Lalibela: Eastern Complex and Beta Giyorgis"; Chapter 6, "Lalibela: Northern Complex and Conclusions"
 Sylvia Pankhurst, Ethiopia: a cultural history (Lalibela House, Essex, 1955). Chapter 9, "The monolithic churches of Lalibela"
 Paul B. Henze, Layers of time: a history of Ethiopia (Shama Books, Addis Ababa, 2004). Chapter 3: "Medieval Ethiopia: isolation and expansion"
 Hancock, Graham, Carol Beckwith & Angela Fisher, African Ark – Peoples of the Horn, Chapter I: Prayers of Stone/The Christian Highlands: Lalibela and Axum. Harvill, An Imprint of HarperCollinsPublishers, 
 Popular Archeology - Through Pilgrim Eyes: The Creation of Significance

External links

 UNESCO World Heritage Site

Holy cities
Populated places in the Amhara Region
Cities and towns in Ethiopia